Boris Bally is an American artist and metal smith in Providence, Rhode Island.

Background
Born 1961 to Swiss Parents, Doris and Alex Bally who had just immigrated to Chicago so that Alex could study at Illinois Institute of Technology. Doris took classes from Brent Kington at the Southern Illinois University. The family moved to Corning, NY where Alex worked as a designer and his brother Nico was born.  The family then moved on to Pittsburgh where Alex began working as an industrial designer for silversmith turned designer Peter Muller-Munk and then on to Westinghouse's Industrial Design Division. Boris Bally was raised in Pittsburgh, Pennsylvania, Bally's interest in the metal arts began at age 13 through a class at the Pittsburgh Center for the Arts, taught by Steve Korpa, where he learned to make jewelry and later brass knuckles and throwing stars. His interest in the crafts continued to grow as he experienced the industry through more classes and meeting and working for local jewelers and artists including Jeff Whisner and Ronald McNeish. He continued taking classes at the Pittsburgh Center for the Arts, won a scholarship for the 1977 Pennsylvania Governor's School for the Arts.  In 1979, he graduated early from Carlynton High School and apprenticed for Alexander Schaffner Golsdschmied in Basel, Switzerland. He then returned to the USA and attended the Tyler School of Art, and transferred to Carnegie Mellon University where he received his BFA. Through his travels and apprenticeships, Bally showed an interest in the more extreme and mechanical aspect of art and design especially in radical new approaches to material use.

Initially, Bally focused on jewellery and flatware to establish himself as a designer and artist. Continuing his interest, he expanded into scrap objects and road signs.

In 1994 he met Lynn E Taylor who was attending Pitt medical school and in 1997 they were married and moved to Providence. RI where she became an intern and resident at the Brown Medical School. In 1998, Bally purchased the Ryan Post building on the Olneyville and Mount Pleasant town line.  In the following years, he rehabilitated it to become their home and his studio.

Teaching
 University of Akron, Metalsmithing II, Adjunct Jewelry Instructor 1995
 Pittsburgh Center for the Arts, Jewelry Instructor, lecturer 1990–1995
 Carnegie Mellon University, Artist/Lecturer, Department of Art, 1993
 Carnegie Mellon University, Adjunct Assistant Professor of Design, 1989–1991

Education
 Carnegie Mellon University, Pittsburgh, Pennsylvania, Prof: Carol Kumata BFA: Metals 1984
 Tyler School of Art, Foundation and Metals Program, Philadelphia, Pennsylvania 1980–1982
 Intensive Goldsmith Apprenticeship, Alexander Schaffner Goldschmied, Basel, Switzerland 1979–1980

Solo exhibitions
 De-Sign: Boris Bally's Exploration of the Available. Kendall College of Art, Sarah Joseph, Grand Rapids, December 15, 2003- Feb 20, 2004
 Urban Enamels: Soul-Stirring Works by Boris Bally. Patina Gallery, Santa Fe, New Mexico, December 14, 2001 – January 13, 2002.
 Introducing Boris Bally, Contemporary Metal Artist. Obsidian Gallery, Tucson, Arizona. June 1–30, 1999.
 American Metalanguage I. main foyer, Barbican Centre, London, England. April 10-June 7, 1998.
 Signage: A Solo Show, Gallery I/O, New Orleans, Louisiana. October 1–31, 1996.
 Constructed Metal Objects. Joanne Rapp Gallery, Scottsdale, Arizona. April 1–3, 1996.
 Structure/Geometry. Nancy Sachs Gallery, St. Louis, Missouri March 8-April 13, 1996.
 Bally/Darway. The Works Gallery, Philadelphia, Pennsylvania. October 1-November 15, 1995.

References

External links
 https://web.archive.org/web/20110708084025/http://www.borisbally.com/about.html
 http://www.artfulhome.com/artist/Boris-Bally/110
Oral history interview with Boris Bally, 2009 May 26-27 from the Smithsonian Archives of American Art

University of Akron faculty
Carnegie Mellon University College of Fine Arts alumni
Carnegie Mellon University faculty
Year of birth missing (living people)
Living people